The 1976–77 Iowa Hawkeyes men's basketball team represented the University of Iowa as members of the Big Ten Conference. The team was led by head coach Lute Olson, coaching in his 3rd season at the school, and played their home games at the Iowa Field House. They finished the season 18–9 overall and 10–8 in Big Ten play (later changed to 20–7, 12–6).

Roster

Schedule/results

|-
!colspan=8| Non-Conference Regular Season
|-

|-
!colspan=8| Big Ten Conference Season
|-

Rankings

References

Iowa
Iowa Hawkeyes men's basketball seasons
Hawkeyes
Hawkeyes